The 1991 Brazilian Grand Prix was a Formula One motor race held at Interlagos on 24 March 1991. It was the second race of the 1991 Formula One World Championship.

The 71-lap race was won from pole position by local driver Ayrton Senna, driving a McLaren-Honda. It was the first time Senna had won his home Grand Prix, in his eighth season of F1. Riccardo Patrese finished second in a Williams-Renault, with Senna's teammate Gerhard Berger third.

Qualifying

Pre-qualifying report
In the Friday morning pre-qualifying session, a Dallara was again the fastest car, but this time it was JJ Lehto who topped the time sheets. He was six tenths of a second ahead of the Jordan of Andrea de Cesaris, who was a fraction faster than his team-mate Bertrand Gachot in third. The fourth pre-qualifier was the other Scuderia Italia Dallara, driven by Emanuele Pirro.

The two Modena Lambos missed out in fifth and sixth, with Eric van de Poele over a second slower than Pirro, with Nicola Larini another second further back. Seventh was Pedro Chaves in the Coloni, followed by Olivier Grouillard in the Fondmetal. Grouillard had initially used an interim chassis, with an eye to the team's new car which was still being completed, and was running well until the suspension broke. He was forced to revert to an older chassis, and was unable to match the times of his opponents.

Pre-qualifying classification

Qualifying report

Qualifying classification

Race

Race report

Ayrton Senna made a perfect start to lead from Nigel Mansell, Riccardo Patrese, Jean Alesi, Gerhard Berger and Alain Prost, building up a lead of three seconds by lap eight. However Mansell was closing and by lap 20 the gap was down to 0.7s. On lap 17 Prost pitted for new tyres, keen to avoid being stuck behind Nelson Piquet's Benetton. Mansell pitted on lap 26, but the stop was terrible - lasting over 14 seconds. This returned him to the race in 5th place behind Patrese, Alesi and Berger.

After Senna and Patrese had made their stops, Mansell was seven seconds behind the lead McLaren. There seemed no doubt that Senna would be caught but the chance never arose as on lap 50 Mansell had to stop for a new set of tyres after a puncture caused by debris on the track.
Unknown to observers, Senna's gearbox was failing, having lost fourth gear and by lap 60 the lead was halved and Mansell had set fastest lap.
Yet it was Mansell's gearbox that gave way first, forcing the Williams into a spin and causing him to retire on lap 61. With just a couple of laps left, Senna had also lost fifth and third gears. Having to maintain sixth gear in slow and medium corners meant that several times he nearly stalled. Patrese was catching him rapidly, but with gearbox problems of his own he was unable to pass.

Senna won 2.9 seconds ahead of Patrese. When he crossed the finish line, he started to scream in celebration of achieving his dream of winning at home. The tremendous struggle of trying to keep the car under control caused him to have muscle cramps and fever. After stopping his car, Senna was almost unable to move on his own. He had to be lifted bodily from the car due to exhaustion and driven to the podium in the medical car. Despite a small fire on the grid and a sticking throttle, Berger claimed the final podium place from Prost, Piquet and Alesi. On the podium, after all that effort, Senna barely managed to lift the trophy.

Race classification

Championship standings after the race

Drivers' Championship standings

Constructors' Championship standings

 Note: Only the top five positions are included for both sets of standings.

References

Brazilian Grand Prix
Brazilian Grand Prix
Grand Prix
Brazilian Grand Prix